Sefwi Sui is a small farming community in Ghana with a population of approximately 3,000 people. A Jewish community from the House of Israel lives in Sefwi Sui. Other Jews from the House of Israel live in Sefwi Wiawso, a larger community located twenty miles from Sefwi Sui.

Like other communities in the Western North Region of Ghana, the Alluolue Festival is celebrated annually in Sefwi Sui.

References

House of Israel (Ghana)
Jewish communities
Populated places in the Western North Region
Sefwi people